Alberto Abalde Díaz (born 15 December 1995) is a Spanish professional basketball player for Real Madrid of the Spanish Liga ACB and the EuroLeague. He has experience on the Spain under-18 and under-20 national teams, having won the bronze and silver medals on the international stage. He competed at the 2020 Summer Olympics.

Career
After playing in Joventut Badalona's youth setup, Abalde made his debut with the first team in 2013. In that year, Abalde became the MVP of the final of the Nike International Junior Tournament, where Joventut beat Barcelona in the final.

The National Basketball Association released a list noting that Abalde had entered the 2015 NBA draft in late April 2015.

On 17 August 2016, Abalde signed a four-year contract with Valencia Basket, who loaned him one more season to the team from Badalona. 

On July 21, 2020, Abalde and Valencia officially parted ways, after his buy-out clause was exercised. Later that day, he signed a lucrative five-year deal with the EuroLeague powerhouse Real Madrid.

Awards and accomplishments

Spain national team
Junior national team 
 2013 FIBA Europe Under-18 Championship: 
 2014 FIBA Europe Under-20 Championship:

Individual
 Nike International Junior Tournament MVP: (2013)

Personal life
Abalde's sister Tamara is also a professional basketball player.

Notes

References

External links 
 
 

1995 births
Living people
Basketball players at the 2020 Summer Olympics
CB Prat players
Joventut Badalona players
Liga ACB players
Olympic basketball players of Spain
Real Madrid Baloncesto players
Small forwards
Spanish men's basketball players
Sportspeople from A Coruña
Valencia Basket players